The New Macau Development Union, formerly known as the Alliance for the Development of Macau, is a political party in the Chinese Special Administrative Region of Macau.

In the 2005 legislative election, the party won 9.3 percent of the popular vote and 1 of the 12 popularly elected seats. In the 2009 legislative election, the party won 9.94 percent of the popular vote and 1 of the 12 popularly elected seats.

Elected members
 Angela Leong, 2005–present

References

Political parties in Macau
Socialist parties in China